Citizens National Bank, since known as the Hilliard-Lyons Building and Kunkel Square, is a building noted for its stone and terracotta facade, located at Fourth and Main Street in downtown Evansville, Indiana. The building is ten stories tall and was the region's first skyscraper. The architect was William Lee Stoddart. It officially opened on Washington's birthday in 1916. In 2011 the building was converted to 46 luxury apartments.

It was listed on the National Register of Historic Places in 1982.

References

Bank buildings on the National Register of Historic Places in Indiana
Commercial buildings completed in 1916
William Lee Stoddart buildings
Buildings and structures in Evansville, Indiana
National Register of Historic Places in Evansville, Indiana